China, as the Republic of China, competed in the Summer Olympic Games for the first time at the 1932 Summer Olympics in Los Angeles, United States.

Delegation

The delegation representing the Republic of China at the Games included the following personnel, as listed in the Official Report of the Games; the names in Chinese are given where known.

Executive Officers
 C. T. Wang, IOC Member for China, President of the Chinese National Olympic Committee (did not attend)
 Wm. Z. L. Sung, Honorary Secretary General and Acting President of the Chinese NOC, Chef de Mission
 J. C. Shen, Member of the Chinese NOC
 C. M. Tobin, Member of the Chinese NOC

Attaché
 Snowpine Liu

Athletes

Only one athlete, the sprinter Liu Changchun, competed for the Republic of China. He competed in the 100 m and 200 m sprints, and also bore the flag of the ROC.

Yu Hsi-Wei, a long-distance runner, was also registered for the Games on 26 June 1932 but was detained by Japanese officials in Manchukuo and did not attend the Games. He is not listed on the roster in the Official Report.

Official
 Carl F. Song, coach of Cheng-Chun Liu

Medical
 G. L. Chee, M.D., foreign consultant, medical staff of the Games

Press
 Paul Fung
 James I. Park
 P. M. Slovo Pachinsky
 Aleksandra Kunicka-Sun

Film
In 2008, a Chinese-language film based on the story of China's participation in the 1932 Olympic games was released, titled The One Man Olympics.

Athletics

Notes

References

Nations at the 1932 Summer Olympics
1932 in Chinese sport
Republic of China (1912–1949) at the Summer Olympics